Christine Jane Baranski (born May 2, 1952) is an American actress. She is a 15-time Primetime Emmy Award nominee, winning once in 1995 for Outstanding Supporting Actress in a Comedy Series for her role as Maryann Thorpe in the sitcom Cybill (1995–1998). Baranski has received further critical acclaim for her performance as Diane Lockhart in the legal drama series The Good Wife (2009–2016) and its spin-off series The Good Fight (2017–2022).

Baranski has appeared in several television films, including To Dance with the White Dog (1993), Eloise at the Plaza and Eloise at Christmastime (both 2003), and Who Is Simon Miller? (2011). Her major Broadway credits include Hide and Seek (1980), Hurlyburly (1984), The House of Blue Leaves (1986), Nick & Nora (1991), and Boeing Boeing (2008). Baranski has also appeared in numerous films, such as Reversal of Fortune (1990), The Birdcage (1996), Cruel Intentions (1999), How the Grinch Stole Christmas (2000), Chicago (2002), Mamma Mia! (2008), Into the Woods (2014), and Mamma Mia! Here We Go Again (2018).

Baranski won two Tony Awards for Best Featured Actress in a Play for the original Broadway productions of The Real Thing in 1984 and Rumors in 1989. For her recurring role as Dr. Beverly Hofstadter in the sitcom The Big Bang Theory (2009–2019), she received four Emmy Award nominations.

Early life and education
Baranski was born in Buffalo, New York, the daughter of Virginia (née Mazurowska) and Lucien Baranski, who edited a Polish-language newspaper. She had an older brother, Michael J. Baranski (1949–1998), who was an advertising executive and who died at age 48. She is of Polish descent, and her grandparents were stage actors in Poland before emigrating to America. Baranski was raised in a heavily Polish and Roman Catholic neighborhood in the Buffalo suburb of Cheektowaga. She attended high school at the Villa Maria Academy where she was class president and salutatorian. She later studied at New York City's Juilliard School (Drama Division Group 3: 1970–1974), where she graduated with a Bachelor of Fine Arts degree in 1974.

Career

Stage

Baranski made her Off-Broadway debut in Coming Attractions at Playwrights Horizons in 1980, and has appeared in several Off-Broadway productions at the Manhattan Theatre Club, starting with Sally and Marsha in 1982.

Baranski made her Broadway debut in Hide & Seek in 1980. For her next Broadway performance, in Tom Stoppard's The Real Thing, she won the 1984 Tony Award Best Featured Actress in a Play. Other Broadway credits include Hurlyburly, The House of Blue Leaves, Rumors (for which she won her second Tony), Regrets Only, Nick & Nora, and the Encores! concert staging of Follies.

At the Kennedy Center in Washington, D.C., Baranski starred as Mrs. Lovett in Sweeney Todd in 2002 (for which she won the 2003 Helen Hayes Award for Outstanding Actress in a Musical) and as the title character in Mame in 2006.

In her first Broadway production since 1991, Baranski was featured as the maid Berthe in the 2008 revival of Boeing Boeing. The show garnered two Tony Awards, one for Best Revival of a Play and the other for Best Actor (Mark Rylance). The original cast was Bradley Whitford (Bernard), Kathryn Hahn (Gloria), Christine Baranski (Berthe), Gina Gershon (Gabriella), and Mary McCormack (Gretchen). The show closed on January 4, 2009.

Baranski also appeared in a one-night-only concert benefit performance of Stephen Sondheim's A Little Night Music for Roundabout Theatre Company as Countess Charlotte Malcolm on January 12, 2009. The cast included Vanessa Redgrave, Natasha Richardson, Victor Garber and Marc Kudisch.

Baranski has won both the Tony Award and Drama Desk Awards twice. In 2018, she was inducted into the American Theater Hall of Fame.

Film
Baranski has appeared in various film roles. Some of her better-known roles are as Katherine Archer in The Birdcage (1996), Martha May Whovier in How the Grinch Stole Christmas (2000), Mary Sunshine in Chicago (2002) and Connie Chasseur in The Ref (1994).

Baranski received further recognition for her role as Tanya Chesham-Leigh in the hit musical film Mamma Mia! (2008), and its sequel Mamma Mia! Here We Go Again (2018).

Baranski played Cinderella's stepmother in the 2014 film adaptation of the musical Into the Woods.

Baranski appeared in the films 9½ Weeks (1986), Legal Eagles (1986), Reversal of Fortune (1990), Addams Family Values (1993), Jeffrey (1995), The Odd Couple II (1998) Bulworth (1998), Cruel Intentions (1999), Bowfinger (1999), Chicago (2002), Trolls (2016) and A Bad Moms Christmas (2017).

Television
Baranski appeared in short-term roles on various daytime soap operas, including All My Children and Another World.

Baranski was featured as Cybill Shepherd's sarcastic, hard-drinking friend Maryann Thorpe in the CBS sitcom Cybill, which ran from 1995 until 1998, during which time she hosted Saturday Night Live and won an Emmy Award as Best Supporting Actress in a Comedy Series along with three other nominations. During this, Baranski portrayed a librarian named Sonja Umdahl in the "Dick and the Single Girl" episode of 3rd Rock from the Sun. A few years later, Baranski received an Emmy nomination for a guest starring role in the NBC series Frasier as a controversial tough love radio psychiatrist named Dr. Nora. The episode, which was named for the character, parodied Dr. Laura Schlessinger. The episode was pulled from syndication by Paramount. Baranski had an uncredited role in the series Now and Again as the voice of Roger's overbearing wife Ruth, who was never seen by viewers.

Baranski later appeared in the 2000–2001 sitcom Welcome to New York and, with John Laroquette, in the 2003–2004 NBC sitcom Happy Family. She co-starred with Bernadette Peters in a pilot for an ABC sitcom, Adopted, in 2005, which was not picked up. She also played Faith Clancy, the mother of Jim Clancy in Ghost Whisperer.

In 2009, Baranski began guest-starring in The Big Bang Theory as Dr. Beverly Hofstadter, a dispassionate psychiatrist and neuroscientist and mother of one of the protagonists, Leonard Hofstadter. She first appeared in the second-season episode "The Maternal Capacitance", for which she received an Emmy nomination. Due to the popularity of her first appearance, Baranski returned in the third season for the Christmas episode "The Maternal Congruence", receiving another Emmy nomination. She appeared in a total of 16 episodes during the show's run, earning four Emmy nominations for her recurring role.

From 2009 to 2016, Baranski played the role of Diane Lockhart, a top litigator and senior partner of a Chicago law firm on the CBS series The Good Wife. She was nominated for the Primetime Emmy Award for Outstanding Supporting Actress in a Drama Series for six seasons of the series, in the years 2010 to 2015. Besides her work on The Good Wife and the aforementioned guest appearances on The Big Bang Theory, her other recent appearances include Ugly Betty in 2009 as Victoria Hartley, the haughty mother of Betty's new boyfriend.

From 2017 to 2022, Baranski starred in the CBS spinoff of The Good Wife, titled The Good Fight. Her character, Diane Lockhart, joins another law firm after being forced to return to work. In the 79th Golden Globe Awards, she was nominated for the Golden Globe Award for Best Actress – Television Series Drama for her work in the fifth season of the show.

Acting style and screen persona
Although recognized for her versatility across genres and performing media, Baranski is particularly known for playing sophisticated and highly educated upper-class women. Consequently, the media began alluding to the resemblance between this repeated on-screen persona and Baranski's real personality. Caroline Hallemann of Town & Country notes that, "For years, the award-winning actress has been the definition of on-screen sophistication". In 2017, the actress told Zac Posen for Interview Magazine, "What I’m getting at is if your career is not predicated on just your physical beauty, you’re able to project a sophistication. You can take sophisticated to your grave. You can be that worldly woman, that woman who looks beautiful dressed up." On the other hand, however, Baranski humorously addressed these claims during her appearance on The Late Show with Stephen Colbert, "Everybody thinks this is, you know, this sophisticated lady, this New York type, these characters that I play, they think that's me. They should be in a room alone with me when I watch the Buffalo Bills. It is loud".

Personal life
Baranski was married to actor Matthew Cowles from October 1983 until his death on May 22, 2014. They have two daughters, Isabel (born 1984), a lawyer, and Lily (born 1987), an actress. She lives in Connecticut.

Filmography

Film

Television

Theatre

Video games

Audio

Awards and nominations

References

thumb

External links

 
 
 
 

1952 births
Living people
20th-century American actresses
20th-century American women singers
20th-century American singers
21st-century American actresses
21st-century American women singers
Actresses from Buffalo, New York
American film actresses
American musical theatre actresses
American people of Polish descent
American stage actresses
American television actresses
American voice actresses
Catholics from Connecticut
Catholics from New York (state)
Drama Desk Award winners
Juilliard School alumni
Outstanding Performance by a Cast in a Motion Picture Screen Actors Guild Award winners
Outstanding Performance by a Female Actor in a Comedy Series Screen Actors Guild Award winners
Outstanding Performance by a Supporting Actress in a Comedy Series Primetime Emmy Award winners
Tony Award winners